Mata is a municipality in Rio Grande do Sul in Brazil.

Paleontology 
The city of Mata has large deposits of petrified trees.

Museum of the city that have fossils: 
Museum Daniel Cargnin.
Palaeobotanical Garden in Mata

References

External links 
 

Municipalities in Rio Grande do Sul